Antoine Renou (1731 in Paris – 13 December 1806) was an 18th–19th-century French painter and playwright.

Antoine Renou was a member then perpetual secretary of the Académie royale de peinture et de sculpture.

He created L'Étoile du matin (1781), one of the plafonnantes paintings of the galerie d'Apollon of the Louvre Palace in Paris, which was his reception piece to the Académie. it was the counterpart to the Soir by Charles Le Brun.

Renou also authored some fifteen theatre plays.

Sources

External links 
 His plays and their presentations on CÉSAR

18th-century French painters
French male painters
19th-century French painters
18th-century French dramatists and playwrights
Painters from Paris
1731 births
1806 deaths
19th-century French male artists
18th-century French male artists